De Guia Enterprises, Inc., (G Liner) is one of the oldest city bus companies in the Philippines. The company serves its routes along central Metro Manila areas (along with EMBC) and along EDSA corridor under Marikina Auto Line Transport Corporation (MALTC)

Etymology

The company was named after the de Guia family, who are said to be the founders of the company.

History

On January 1, 1956, De Guia Enterprises, Inc. (G Liner) was formed by Mr. Pedro De Guia, Mrs. Segunda De Guia, Mr. Placido De Guia, Mr. Serafin De Guia and Mr. Jose Macapagal and was registered with the Securities and Exchange Commission, Manila for the purpose of engaging in the business of motor vehicle in all its phases, branches and sidelines.

On October 22, 1957, De Guia Enterprises, Inc., applied for authority to operate ten additional TPU units on its line Little Baguio-P. Miranda and was approved on February 27, 1958.

To better serve the increasing commuting public on the Crame-Quiapo line, G.Liner petitioned for authority to divert eight of its twenty eight(28) units operating on the line Little-Baguio-Quiapo via P. Guevarra. On the proposed modification of route, the eight(8) autotrucks shall pass Santolan road, P Guevarra, P. Casal, P. Concepcion, Arrocerros to Quiapo. This Petition was granted March 15, 1963.

On February 12, 1964. De Guia Enterprises, Inc., believing it can render better public service to the people in the area affected, applied with the Public Service Commission for authority to extend its service on the line Little Baguio (San Juan City) - Barbosa (Quiapo) to the corner of Gilmore Avenue and EDSA operating the same three units already authorized as well as five reserve units.

After Martial Law, The Company suffered great setbacks due to increase in fuel cost of gasoline, without commensurate increase in fare. So the company decided to dispose gasoline fueled buses.

In 1978, the company started to purchase diesel-fueled brand new Mitsubishi buses until it reached 40 units in the year 1983. The number of units were increased in 1985 when it purchased second hand Mitsubishi Fuso buses, bringing its total 54 units.

In the line with the company's expansion. 1988 saw 10 brand new Hino buses and 3 second hand Mitsubishi Fuso buses added to its fleet. Again in 1989, 15 brand new Nissan units were acquired through the Bus Installment Purchase Plan (BIPP 1).

To date with the latest addition of 40 aircon and 20 non-aircon buses, the company's total fleet numbers over a hundred aircon and non-aircon busses. The said units ply between Taytay/Quiapo and Cainta/Quiapo.

Going on its 57th year of operation. De Guia Enterprises, Inc., Continuous to commit itself to serving the public by providing an efficient, comfortable, and safe service to its riding public.

Recent updates

Last December 2009, G Liner announced the acquisition of Eastern Metropolitan Bus Corporation (EMBC). All city operation bus units and its franchise were taken over by the company due to the latter's focus on tourist chartered and shuttle service. 
They also acquired the franchise of Marikina Auto Line Transport Corporation (MALTC) and its units.

Fleet

G Liner has maintained and utilized Hino, Isuzu, Youyi, Ankai, Dongfeng and Wuzhoulong buses, as well as UD Nissan Diesel and Guilin Daewoo Buses, operated by MALTC and EMBC.

Hino
AK174/AK176
RF821
FG8J 
RK1JST
Isuzu
CHR660
FTR132 
FTR32/33
LT132 
LT133 
Youyi
ZGT6108
Ankai
HFC6108
Dongfeng  
EQ6100R
DHZ6100L 
Wuzhoulong
FDG6111HEVG
UD Nissan Diesel 
CPB87
PKB212
Guilin Daewoo 
GDW6119H2
GDW6900K6

Routes

Taytay - Quiapo via Cainta, Manila East Road, Ortigas Avenue,  Magsaysay Blvd.
Cainta - Quiapo via Ortigas Avenue, Magsaysay Blvd.
Antipolo, Rizal - Cubao, Quezon City via Sumulong Highway

Acquisitions

Marikina Auto Line Transport Corporation (MALTC)
Montalban - Baclaran via EDSA, Ayala, Aurora Blvd., Marikina and Vice Versa
San Mateo - Baclaran via EDSA, Ayala, Commonwealth Ave., Batasan Road and Vice Versa
Navotas - Baclaran, via EDSA, Ayala, and Vice Versa
Eastern Metropolitan Bus Corporation (EMBC) operated by RRCG Transport - They are now focusing on Chartered/Special trips & Shuttle Services.
Antipolo - Divisoria  via Shaw Blvd., (This route was only on Before/During Morning Rush hours using some of their Ordinary units that are not used for Shuttle Services.)
Siniloan, Laguna - Philippine International Convention Center (PICC) via EDSA - Ayala, Tanay. (by RRCG Transport buses)
Tanay, Rizal- EDSA Crossing Shaw Mandaluyong via Antipolo, Rizal use Rizal Metrolink Inc.

External links
G Liner Official Website

Bus companies of the Philippines
Companies based in Rizal